Saurashtra University is a university in Gujarat state in India.  This university was established on 23 May 1967, in Rajkot city, and the administrative headquarters are at Rajkot.

History
Saurashtra University was created on a rigorous demand, for a separate university out of Gujarat University (Ahmedabad), from the eminent educationists and freedom fighters of the Saurashtra region. The demand was more prominent after the creation of Gujarat state on May 1, 1961. The Saurashtra University Act was passed by the Legislative Assembly of Gujarat in the year 1965(Gujarat Act No. 39 of 1965). Saurashtra University, established on 23 May 1967, having two headquarters in the initial stage i.e. Rajkot and Bhavnagar. After the incorporation of the Bhavnagar University, Rajkot became the sole headquarters of the Saurashtra University.

Campus
The present jurisdiction of the University includes Amreli, Jamnagar, Rajkot, Surendranagar, and Morbi districts.

Organisation and administration
It has 29 Post Graduate Departments on its campus and 238 affiliated colleges. 

The university has important seats of learning spreading knowledge in the respective fields i.e. Nehru Chair, Baba Saheb Ambedkar Chair, Sardar Vallabhbhai Patel Chair, Swami Dayanand Saraswati Chair, Gulabdas Broker Chair, etc. The University runs a centre of learning and research in the name of Shri Zaverchand Meghani i.e. Meghani Lok Sahitya Kendra. The university in collaboration with Commissionerate of Industries, Government of Gujarat, and Department of Science and Technology, Government of India, has started National Facility for Drugs Discovery (NFDD) in the year 2009. The NFDD is a state of art centre of research and innovation. Later in the year 2014, the NFDD was transformed into Centre of Excellence (COE). COE is actively involved in generating funds from industrial consultancy.

Accreditation
The Saurashtra University has the pride to be the first ‘B’ Grade accredited Conventional State University by the NAAC in the state of Gujarat in the year 2014. The Saurashtra University is one of the universities in Gujarat going voluntarily for NAAC accreditation DURING very initial stage of NAAC in the year 2001. The university's first cycle rating was 4 Star in February 2002. Subsequently, the university was re-accredited (2nd Cycle) with ‘B’ Grade having CGPA of 2.97 in March 2009. The Internal Quality Assurance Cell (IQAC) of the university is functional since 2004 as per the recommendations of NAAC. Nevertheless, as per the Peer Team Report of NAAC 2009, the Saurashtra University was the first university in the country to appoint a full-time coordinator.

Student life
Saurashtra University is vibrant in terms of organising youth festivals, cultural programmes, job fairs, e-Tab distribution fairs, Ranji Trophy tournament, Pro Kabaddi League, Saurashtra Premier League (SPL), inter university championships, etc. Saurashtra University students are performing well in various events at state and national levels.

References

External links
 Saurashtra University website

Universities in Gujarat
Education in Rajkot
1967 establishments in Gujarat
Educational institutions established in 1967